Fubar Films is an Irish film and television production company based in Dublin, Ireland. Fubar Films has been responsible for the production of Flick, Trouble with Sex, Eliot & Me, and comedy series On the Couch. Key people in the production company include producer Fiona Bergin and director Fintan Connolly.

Productions

Film
Flick (2000) feature
Trouble with Sex (2005) feature
Eliot & Me (2012) feature
Barber (2022) feature

Television
On the Couch (2013)
Zara World (2014)
Circus World (2016)
All Aboard (2018)

References

External links 

Film production companies of Ireland